Robertson is a town in the Western Cape Province of South Africa, known as the valley of wine and roses, at the heart of the wine route - Route 62.

Founded in 1853 and named after Dr , a Scottish Dutch Reformed Church minister.

Situated in the fertile Robertson Valley, farming and wagon building were the town's original industries. However, after the Second Anglo-Boer War of 1899, the wagon building industry collapsed when the railways took over the transport of all goods.

Robertson subsequently became famous for its ostrich farming, but this industry collapsed as well shortly after World War I, and the farmers of the area turned to wine and fruit farming. Later, several successful racehorse stud farms were founded. Agriculture remains the mainstay of the town's economy.

Tourism
Tourism has grown in recent years and the town has several Western Cape provincial heritage sites, such as the Pink Church (1859), the Museum (1860), the Edwardian-style house 12 Piet Retief Street (1904), the Victorian-style house at 59 Van Reenen Street (1914), and the Powder House (used as a store for gunpowder).

Robertson has a population of over 20,000 civilians

Skydiving at Robertson
Western Province Sport Parachute Club (WPSPC) - Skydive Robertson, founded in 1972, is the oldest remaining skydiving club in South Africa. In July 2008, the club relocated to Robertson.

WPSPC operates from Robertson Airfield on weekends and public holidays and facilitates tandem skydiving and student training, and provides a facility for sports skydivers.

The 2011 South African National Skydiving Championships was hosted by Skydive Robertson and held at Robertson Airfield. This is the first time the national skydiving championships has been held in the Western Cape.

Robertson Airfield
Robertson Airfield is an unmanned airfield, with a 1 600 meter asphalt runway, situated 1 km to the east of Robertson.

Gallery

References

Populated places in the Langeberg Local Municipality
Populated places established in 1853
1853 establishments in the Cape Colony